Rockliffe St Patrick Fellowes (17 March 1884 – 28 January 1950), was a Canadian actor born in Ottawa, Ontario, Canada. He starred in films such as Regeneration and Monkey Business.

Biography
 Rockliffe St Patrick Fellowes was born in New Edinburgh, Ottowa, Ontario on St Patrick's Day 1884, a descendant of noted Canadian families. 
After following a business career for some years, he gave it up to go onto the stage in 1907 and later made his entry into films as the redemptive hero of Raoul Walsh's 1915 silent gangster film Regeneration.

Partial filmography

 Regeneration (1915)
 Where Love Leads (1916)
 The Web of Desire (1917)
 The Bondage of Fear (1917)
Man's Woman (1917)
 Friend Husband (1918)
 The Panther Woman (1918)
 The Cup of Fury (1920)
 Yes or No ? (1920)
 In Search of a Sinner (1920)
 The Point of View (1920)
 The Price of Possession (1921)
 Bits of Life (1921)
 Island Wives (1922)
 The Strangers' Banquet (1922)
 Trifling with Honor (1923)
 The Remittance Woman (1923)
 The Spoilers (1923)
 Borrowed Husbands (1924)
 Flapper Wives (1924)
 The Signal Tower (1924)
 Missing Daughters (1924)
 Cornered (1924)
 The Border Legion (1924)
 The Garden of Weeds (1924)
 East of Suez (1925)
 Without Mercy (1925)
 Counsel for the Defense (1925)
 Rose of the World (1925)
 Rocking Moon(1926)
 Silence (1926)
 Honesty – The Best Policy (1926)
 Syncopating Sue (1926)
 The Taxi Dancer (1927)
 The Satin Woman (1927)
 Outside the Law (1930)
 Monkey Business (1931)
 Renegades of the West (1932)
 20,000 Years in Sing Sing (1932) unbilled
 The Phantom Broadcast (1933)
 Rusty Rides Alone (1933)
 Back Page (1934)

References

External links

Rockcliffe Fellowes portraits (New York City Public Library, Billy Rose collection)

1880s births
1950 deaths
Male actors from Ottawa
Canadian male film actors
Canadian male silent film actors
20th-century Canadian male actors
Canadian emigrants to the United States